The list includes the city, country, the codes of the International Air Transport Association (IATA airport code) and the International Civil Aviation Organization (ICAO airport code), and the airport's name, with the airline's hubs marked.

Destinations

Air Algérie operates scheduled international services to 39 destinations in 26 countries in Europe, North America, Africa, Asia, and the Middle East.  These international services are operated out of these Algerian airports: Algiers, Annaba, Batna, Bejaia, Biskra, Chlef, Constantine, El Oued, Oran, Setif, Tlemcen.  Domestic services serve 32 airports within Algeria (as of January 2016).

References

Air Algérie
Lists of airline destinations